The following television stations broadcast in digital or analog on channel 6 in Canada:

 CFCN-TV-7 in Bassano, Alberta
 CFCN-TV-11 in Sparwood, British Columbia
 CFCN-TV-15 in Mount Goldie, British Columbia
 CFCN-TV-17 in Waterton Park, Alberta
 CFQC-TV-2 in North Battleford, Saskatchewan
 CFRE-TV-2 in Fort Qu'Appelle, Saskatchewan
 CFTK-TV-1 in Prince Rupert, British Columbia
 CFTS-TV in Teslin, Yukon
 CHAT-TV in Medicine Hat, Alberta
 CHBC-TV-8 in Canoe, British Columbia
 CJCB-TV-1 in Inverness, Nova Scotia
 CJCH-TV-6 in Caledonia, Nova Scotia
 CJOH-TV-6 in Deseronto, Ontario 
 CKCK-TV-2 in Willow Bunch, Saskatchewan
 CKPG-TV-4 in Mackenzie, British Columbia
 CKRN-TV-2 in Ville-Marie, Quebec

06 TV stations in Canada